Donna Biscoe (born September 30, 1955) is an American actress.

Early years
Biscoe was born in Fort Benning, Georgia, the daughter of Mildred Skillern, a retired Carver High School English teacher. Biscoe attended Carver, then graduated from Kendrick High School in Columbus in 1973 and later graduated from Clark Atlanta University with a bachelor's degree in elementary education. Biscoe later went to Lee Strasberg Theatre and Film Institute in New York for six months.

In the 1980s, a casting agent discovered Biscoe while she worked as a flight attendant for Eastern Airlines.

Career
After returning to Atlanta, Biscoe began acting in plays, including playing Martin Luther King Jr.’s mother in A Boy King at the Atlanta Children’s Theater. In late 1980s, Biscoe also began appearing in an supporting roles in film and television, including four appearances in In the Heat of the Night, CBS miniseries Mama Flora's Family (1998), and well as films Love Crimes (1992) and Blue Sky (1994).

Biscoe worked mostly in theatre in 1980s and 1990s. Her stage credits including Doubt, To Kill A Mockingbird, Waiting To Be Invited, Holiday Heart, Homebody Kabul, Our Town and Fences. In 2000s, she began appearing in films playing mostly roles of mothers of grandmothers. Her film credits including Motives 2 and Three Can Play That Game (2007) starring Vivica A. Fox, Mississippi Damned (2009), The Sacrament (2013), The Hunger Games: Mockingjay – Part 1 (2014), and Girls Trip (2017). She played Taraji P. Henson's character mother in the 2016 biographical drama film Hidden Figures, and Kevin Hart's mother in the 2018 comedy Night School.

On television, Biscoe guest-starred in Drop Dead Diva, Nashville and Being Mary Jane. She had a recurring roles in the two Oprah Winfrey Network series: drama Greenleaf as Clara Jackson, and prime time soap opera Ambitions as Robin Givens' character mother. In 2017, she began starring in the Bounce TV prime time soap opera Saints & Sinners playing villainous Lady Leona Byrd. The series ended in 2022 after six seasons.

Other activities 
In 2008, Biscoe ran a Pilates studio in downtown Atlanta.

Filmography

Film

Television

References

External links

1955 births
African-American actresses
Clark Atlanta University alumni
American television actresses
American film actresses
American stage actresses
20th-century American actresses
21st-century American actresses
Living people
20th-century African-American women
20th-century African-American people
21st-century African-American women
21st-century African-American people